Bhuvasan is a village in the Surat Metropolitan Region, part of the Bardoli Taluka in Surat district of the Indian state of Gujarat. Bhuvasan is home of a primary school, and of a Hindu temple dedicated to various gods. The village has a population of around 2000.

References

Villages in Surat district